Hermann Baranowski (11 June 1884 in Schwerin – 5 February 1940 in Aue) was a German politician and military figure. A member of the Nazi Party, he is best known as the commandant of two German concentration camps of the SS Death's Head unit.  He was the Schutzhaftlagerführer of Dachau concentration camp in 1938, where he had been sent as compound leader in 1936. He served as the SS-Oberführer of Sachsenhausen concentration camp from February 1938 - September 1939. He was noted to be especially sadistic.

References

1884 births
1940 deaths
People from Schwerin
People from the Grand Duchy of Mecklenburg-Schwerin
SS-Oberführer
Dachau concentration camp personnel
Sachsenhausen concentration camp personnel
Nazi concentration camp commandants
Schutzhaftlagerführer
Lichtenburg concentration camp personnel